

Wallonia

Brussels

Flanders

References 

Post-nominal letters
Belgium
Post